This type of music originates from the Rajasthan, one of the states of India and home to several important centers of Indian musical development, including Udaipur, Jodhpur and Jaipur.  The region's music shares similarities both with nearby areas of India and the other side of the border, in the nanaga , bukhmanga pakisthan Pakistani province of Sindh.

Overview
Rajasthan has a diverse collection of musician castes, including langas, sapera, bhopa, and Manganiar. There are two traditional classes of musicians: the Langas, who stuck mostly exclusively to Muslim audiences and styles, and the Manganiars, who had a more liberal approach.

Traditional music includes the women's Panihari songs, which lyrically describes chores, especially centered on water and wells, both of which are an integral part of Rajasthan's desert culture.  Other songs, played by various castes, normally begin with the alap, which sets the tune and is followed by a recital of a couplet (dooba). Epic ballads tell of heroes like Devnarayan Bhagwan, Gogaji, Ramdeoji, Pabuji and Tejaji. The celebration of changing seasons is also very central to folk music of Rajasthan. Celebration of the coming of the Monsoons or the harvest season are central to most traditional folk songs. Songs also revolve around daily activities of the local people for instance a song about not sowing Jeera (Cumin) as it is difficult to tend. Or for instance another song about Podina (Mint) and how it is liked by various members of the family (an allegorical reference to a local liquor extracted from mint is also made). Every day common themes are the center of traditional rajasthani folk music.

One of the most famous Rajasthani Maand singers is Allah Jilai Bai of the Bikaner Gharana.

Notable musicians
Allah Jilai Bai
Kheta Khan
Meme Khan
Seema Mishra
Prakash Mali
Chotu Singh Rawna
Anupriya Lakhawat
Hemraj Goyal
Dapu Khan
Ila Arun

See also
Jaipur-Atrauli gharana
Rapperiya Baalam
Musical Instruments of Rajasthan
Veena Music

References
 Monograph on Langas: a folk musician caste of Rajasthan. by Komal Kothari.  1960.
 Folk musical instruments of Rajasthan: a folio, by Komal Kothari. Rajasthan Institute of Folklore, 1977.
 Bards, ballads and boundaries: an ethnographic atlas of music traditions in West Rajasthan, by Daniel Neuman, Shubha Chaudhuri, Komal Kothari. Seagull, 2007. .

Rajasthan